Divlje Jagode is a Bosnian and former Yugoslavian hard rockheavy metal band, formed in 1977. The band is widely considered to be regional pioneers of the heavy metal genre and one of the most popular and enduring icons of rock music in Bosnia and Herzegovina and former Yugoslavia. They have endured many lineup changes over the years, remained active in the music industry and retained their popularity throughout the years. In 40 years since its founding, the band have released 13 studio albums, many singles, compilation albums, and sold around 4 million records.

Biography

1970s: Formation and initial success
Divlje Jagode were formed in 1977 in Zagreb, Croatia by guitarist Sead "Zele" Lipovača (a former "Biseri", "Selekcija" and "Zenit" member). A very talented guitar player from his early years, Lipovača was what was considered to be a local wonderkid. He was 22 years old when he formed the band. The first Divlje Jagode lineup consisted of vocalist Ante "Toni "Janković, bass guitarist Nihad Jusufhodžić (a former "Zenit" member), keyboardist Mustafa Ismailovski (a former "Grešnici" member) and drummer Adonis Dokuzović (a former "Novi Akordi" member). The band achieved high popularity with their first singles: rock ballads "Jedina moja" and "Patkica" and a cover of Bosnian folk song "Moj dilbere". In 1978 they released their debut self-titled album Divlje Jagode ("Wild Strawberries"), which featured, among others, a number of Deep Purple and Black Sabbath inspired songs, a new version of ballad "Jedina moja" and song "Krivo je more", the two of which became huge hits, and remained so, until today. The album was released by Jugoton, then the largest record label and chain record store in the country. After the album was released, the band made a break because of part of the band members' army obligations. Ismailovski joined the band "Srebrna Krila", and Lipovača, alongside Marina Tucaković, worked on music for popular regional disco band "Mirzino Jato".

1980–1986: Continued success and breakthrough
In 1980, Divlje Jagode continued their activity with the new lineup: Janković, Lipovača, drummer Nasko Budimlić and bass guitarist, then relatively unknown, Alen Islamović. Unsatisfied by their previous record label's work in promotion of their first album, Lipovača makes a decision to move to Sarajevo, and to local major record label, Diskoton. With the new lineup, the band recorded their second album, entitled Stakleni Hotel ("Glass Hotel"), which marked their complete shift towards heavy metal. The album was recorded in Belgrade, and released through Diskoton in February 1981. The album was produced by Lipovača and Enco Lesić. The songs' lyrics were written by Elvis J. Kurtovich, Goran Petranović, Marina Tucaković and Islamović. The album's biggest hits were "Autostop" and ballads "Dodirni me, skloni bol" and "Potraži put". On the tour that followed the album release, Divlje Jagode played around one hundred concerts. The most famous concert of the tour was in September, at the Belgrade Hippodrome, where Divlje Jagode played alongside one of the most popular bands in the entire region, Bijelo Dugme, and British heavy metal band Iron Maiden, who played there for the first time in this region.

In 1982, lead singer Ante Janković left the band. He decided to start a career as a solo artist, and was dissatisfied with the band's direction toward a much heavier sound. They parted ways amicably and Janković would be seen in following years many times as a frequent collaborator and guest musician, on several occasions. In September 1983, Divlje Jagode released their third studio album Motori ("Motorcycles"), and first with Alen Islamović on vocals. The album was recorded in "Music Park Studios" in Bad Homburg vor der Höhe, Germany, and produced by Theo Werdin. This album was a turning point for the band and is considered to be a major breakthrough in their carrier, so far. The title track became a huge hit, and was considered to be their most famous song, even to this day. Songs "Šejla" (which Islamović wrote for his ex-girlfriend), "Zagrizi rokenrol" and ballads "Nasmiješi se" and "Ne želiš kraj" (written by Janković, before he left the band), were well accepted and brought many new fans for the band.  On the tour that followed Motori release, on several occasions they were joined by Janković, their former singer. Following this album, Divlje Jagode was considered as one of the most popular bands in the country. They were recipients of several music awards, and were included in many popular magazines at the time.

After finishing their tour, the band starts working on their follow-up album. Again, the place and the recording studio are the same as with the latest, and November 1983 marks the release of the album Čarobnjaci ("Wizards"). Lipovača was in charge with production, music and some writing, while Islamović wrote the majority of songs. The album didn't achieve the same popularity as Motori, but was received well enough, with the title track and song "Metalni radnici" singled out. During the album's supporting tour Islamović receives an invitation from Goran Bregović to join Bijelo Dugme as the replacement for their current vocalist Željko Bebek. Unsure of this proposal, and the fact that Bebek was still a member of the band, and it wasn't clear when, or even if he is going leave, Islamović turns this offer down. Another reason is that shortly before that, Divlje Jagode were approached by "Trans Atlantic Records" in London for a potential contract, which if proven successful would mean the band's possible breakthrough on European and even world market. Tensions between the band, especially with Islamović and Lipovača began to rise around this time, though they were temporarily withdrawn by Islamović's decision to stay.

By the end of the year, Divlje Jagode got another musician within their ranks. It was bass guitarist Zlatan Ćehić "Ćeha". This would mean that Islamović will concentrate only on vocals, and with this lineup, the band start work on their next studio album. Recording and mixing were done in studios "RTV Sarajevo" in Sarajevo, and "Music Park Studios" in Bad Homburg vor der Höhe, as was the case with their previous releases. In March 1985, again through Diskoton, studio album entitled Vatra ("Fire"), was released. Music and composing were done by Lipovača, while Islamović and Slobodan Đurašović did the writing. The album was produced again by Theo Werdin, who also wrote the song "Touch Me Little Girl", the only song on the record wrote and performed in the English language. Although with a bit less commercial success than their previous efforts, the album was well-received, with several hit songs like "Ciganka", "Let na drugi svijet", "Divljakuša, and "Moja si".

Soon after they finished their tour, the band signed a five-year contract with British record company Logo Records, located in London. This would mean recording and touring in England, with much-awaited opportunity for international success. This was a feat not yet accomplished by any other band from this region. Divlje Jagode, from that point on, would perform by their name, translated in English language: "Wild Strawberries".

1986–1990: Wild Strawberries and lineup changes
In 1986, they started recording an English language album in the studio "Matrix" in London, with producer Keith Woolvin. Eight of their old songs were re-recorded with English language lyrics and the album featured two new songs, "Fire on the Water" and "Wild Boys". In February, Divlje Jagode released a single "Shayla" and had performed in a number of English clubs. They also had a live show in the famous London club "Marquee Club". At the attendance, among others, were world-renowned keyboard players Don Airey and Keith Emerson. Airey, who at the time was a member of British hard rock band, Whitesnake, was later featured as a guest musician on their upcoming album. Shortly after, the band manager came to Lipovača, for a possibility of him joining Whitesnake, as the band were in a search for a second guitar player at the time. Lipovača stated later in an interview, that it was Don Airey the one who suggested this to their manager. Being already committed to present obligations, Lipovača didn't proceed with the offer and decided to stay, focusing on his current band's career.

However, after this time, things would start to go in an unfavourable direction for the band. Release of their album was constantly delayed by the record company, and as time passed by, tensions and differences between the band members would start to show. Unsure of their career in England, constant album release delays, and the fact that the band wasn't making enough profit, Alen Islamović decides to return to Sarajevo. Immediately after his return, he receives a second invitation form Goran Bregović, to join Bijelo Dugme, which this time, he accepts. The band was also left by Nasko Budimić, who decides to retire temporarily. At one point during the year, Lipovača was left as the only band member who was still in London. After turning down an offer to join several local musicians, Lipovača, also decides to leave London, and return to Sarajavo. After his return, he found out that Islamović joined Bijelo Dugme, the fact that bothered him and created further friction between two musicians. By the end of the year, record label Diskoton released a compilation album entitled Najbolje ("The Best"). The year ended with Divlje Jagode without a definitive lineup.

In the beginning of 1987, Lipovača, supported by Zlatan Ćehić, decided to put together another lineup. Soon after, they started looking for a new vocalist. The album Wild Strawberries was finally released in May 1987, by Logo Records, almost a year and a half since its recording, but the band did not have any live performances following the release, and the album itself was proved unsuccessful. Wild Strawberries was released in Sweden, Germany, Italy and Netherlands. In summer, the band's lineup is finally filled up by their new vocalist Mladen Vojičić "Tifa", the former Bijelo Dugme singer (who Islamović replaced). Also, among new band members were drummer Edin Šehović (a former "Country Carma", "Bandoleros" and "Tusk" member) and keyboardist Vladimir Podany (a former "Armija B" member). This lineup started recording their next album, produced by Peter Hinton, known for his collaboration with British heavy metal band Saxon. The album, entitled Konji ("Horses") was released in the beginning of 1988. It contained several well-received songs, as the title track and re-recorded version of the song "Divlje Jagode", originally released on the band's first album. First single was an instrumental cover of Wolfgang Amadeus Mozart's Turkish March and the biggest hit was ballad "Zauvjek tvoj", which remained so until today.

This lineup did not last long either; in the middle of 1988, during the tour, Vojičić, Podany and Šehović left the band. Ćehić took over the vocals, and the drums were played by Dragan Jankelić. During the tour in 1989, they were also joined by their former and original vocalist Ante Janković, who performed mostly songs from his period in the band. His participation was highly praised by the fans and the crowd on live concerts. By the end of the year the former Osmi Putnik frontman Zlatan Stipišić "Gibonni" became the band's new vocalist. This lineup recorded demos, mainly in Sarajevo in digital sound studio "Vogue". This helped Lipovača to sign a five-year contract deal in the United States, but that project was never realized. Soon afterward, Stipišić left the band and returned to Split to start his solo career. Shortly after these events, Divlje Jagode disbanded.

1990s: Disbandment years and reunion
At the beginning of Yugoslav wars in 1991, Lipovača lived in London and Zagreb. During this time he recorded his first solo album, with Divlje Jagode members Zlatan Ćehić and Nasko Budimlić, while on vocals were Žanil "Žak" Tataj, Emir Čerić and Tina Tina Rupčić. The album was recorded in studio "Roccoco", in Zagreb. He was also involved in many humanitarian concerts across Zagreb, and as the war started to spread to his current home in Sarajevo, he decided to stop making music for a while. In 1993, Lipovača's first solo album was released. He was credited on it by his longtime nickname "Zele". The album entitled Magic Love was released through Croatia Records and was recorded entirely in English language. Production was done by Nikša Bratoš, who also did the keyboard parts, and backing vocals. The songs were written by Tataj and former "Jaogde" member Zlatan Stipišić, while the music was composed by Lipovača. Although released as his solo album at the time, the album was initially supposed to be next Divlje Jagode effort, and as a result it is included in the band's discography.

During 1993, Lipovača makes a decision to officially reform Divlje Jagode. Lineup is made with Ćehić and Budimlić. Ćehić also took over the vocals and the band went to Germany, where they play several humanitarian concerts. While in Germany, they started working on their next studio album. The album was recorded in Gelsenkirchen, with Ćehić on vocals. At the beginning of 1994, album Labude, kad rata ne bude ("Swan, when the war is gone") was released, again through Croatia Records. Live concerts across Croatia and Germany followed, and soon in other European cities. In 1995, after finishing a series of concerts, Zlatan Ćehić leaves the band, so he could work on his upcoming solo album. Bass guitarist Sanin Karić was hired in his place, and the band continue their work. Concerts throughout Europe follow, and also the work on their next record. They are joined once more by Žanil Tataj, and this lineup recorded album Sto vjekova ("A Hundred Centuries") in 1996. The album was recorded in Stuttgart, Germany in studio "Boston" and released by German record label Nimfa in 1997. After the album release, Karić left the band and was replaced by Dejan Orešković. An additional drummer, Thomas Balaž, was hired as a temporary replacement for Budimlić, on several occasions. After series of concerts across Croatia, Bosnia and Slovenia, the band took a short break. By the end of 1999, after a series of numerous concerts across Europe, Žanil Tataj leaves the band.

2000–present
By the end of 1999, and the departure of their previous singer, Divlje Jagode regrouped with the new lineup. It consisted of previously hired drummer Thomas Balaž, bass player Dejan Orešković, and a new vocalist; this time it was Pero Galić, who until that time, worked as a main singer for a Croatian hard rock band "Opća Opasnost". After their breakup, Galić accepted an invitation from Lipovača, and soon after, they began working on the band's upcoming studio album. It wasn't until 2002, that they showed up for the first time in public, with this lineup. Their next album, entitled Od neba do neba ("From sky to sky") was released in 2003, by Croatia Records, seven years since their previous release. The album was recorded and mixed in three years period, in many different recording studios across the region and Europe. It marks the band's return to heavier sound, comparing to their previous two albums, which were more ballad oriented. The album included re-recorded version of one of their biggest hits, song "Motori", and also "Kap po kap" (a song previously recorded by Mladen Vojičić Tifa in 1995, titled "Duge kiše јеsenje"). The album's biggest hit was ballad "Marija". Ante Janković was featured as a guest singer, on song "Ne krivi me".

Next year, in 2004, Croatia Records released a double compilation album "The very best of", which contains many of their most popular songs, as well as a new version of the hit ballad "Krivo je more", from their first studio album. Divlje Jagode then began the tour in support of the new album. They depart for the United States and Canada, and after numerous concerts there, they continue touring in the entire region throughout ex Yugoslavia. In 2005, Pero Galić left the band, and was replaced by their original vocalist Ante Janković, for the following tour in the United States. During the tour, they played a concert in Chicago, together with Croatian rock band Parni Valjak. After finishing this tour, they started another one, this time in Australia, joined by returning bass player Sanin Karić. The band also played several shows in Switzerland.

In 2006, Galić returns to Divlje Jagode, along with long-time member, bass player Zlatan Ćehić. In April, they release a new single, "Piramida". The same year they release a "box set" collection, containing all studio albums released so far in their career, along with the newest single "Piramida" and Lipovača's solo album Magic Love. In spring 2007, they released another single, re-recorded version of song "Zvijezda sjevera", sung by Ćehić, along with music video. During the same year, the band announced that they will start working on a follow-up studio album. In July, together with Galić's previous band "Opća Opasnost", they play as an opening act at Whitesnake concert in Osijek. Next year in 2008, Galić left the band; this time it was so he could return to recently reunited "Opća Opasnost". In Divlje Jagode then again returns Ante Janković as a main vocalist.

During next several years, Divlje Jagode mainly continue touring across the region, playing local festivals and concerts, and also have several international bouts. Within this time, the band members change constantly, without any permanent and definitive lineup. Many previous band members join on various occasions at live performances, while work on the next studio album is still in progress. On 25 January 2012, the band released a new single "Ne, nisam ja", with singer/guitarist Marko Osmanović on vocals, which will be also released on the band's upcoming album. The music video was shot in Sarajevo. In February and March 2012, "Jagode" went on tour in Australia, performing three concerts in Melbourne, Sydney and Brisbane on "On the Road Again" tour. In 2013, Lipovača hired a new vocalist, Livio Berak, from Zagreb. He first met him in 2010, during regional talent rock show "Rat Bendova", where Berak participated with his band, "Livio Berak Trio", reaching the finals. While on vocals, Berak also serves as a band's second guitar player.

After 10 years since the latest, Divlje Jagode released a new studio album, entitled Biodinamička Ljubav ("Biodynamic Love") in December 2013. The album was released through Croatia Records and features 11 songs. The line-up consisted of Lipovača (guitars, backing vocals), Livio Berak (vocals, guitar), Damjan Deurić (keyboards), Nasko Budimlić (drums) and András Ispán (bass). Among several guest musicians, were Žanil "Žak" Tataj (vocals), Ivana Peters (vocals), Vladimir Kmoniček (vocals), Zlatan Ćehić (bass) and Vlatka Pokos (backing vocals).

Nearing 40 years anniversary, the band released four singles, which will be included on their upcoming studio album. The first single, released in 2018 was a new song, "Znamo da je kraj". Along with music videos, they released three re-recorded versions of songs "Zauvjek Tvoj", performed by Tifa (previously released in 1988 on album Konji), "Zbog tebe draga" (previously on 1994 album Labude, kad rata ne bude), sung by new bass player Damjan Mileković, and "Sama si" (from 1983 album Čarobnjaci), performed together by Berak and Žanil Tataj. Also, in October 2018, they released a two-part "box-set" of albums, "Original Album Collection", Vol.1 and Vol.2, which contains all twelve studio albums recorded by the band, so far.

In the summer of 2019, the band marked 40 years of recording activity, by performing live in BHRT studio in Sarajevo. Many musicians who were members of the band at some point during their career, joined them on stage. Among those, were vocalists Mladen Vojičić Tifa, Žanil Žak Tataj, Ante "Toni" Janković, Pero Galiić and Marko Osmanović.

After four singles, released during a two year-period, Divlje Jagode released their 13th studio album, entitled Jukebox, in February 2020. The album marks the band's 40+ years of recording activity and features guest appearances of several musicians who worked with the band during that time. It was released through Croatia Records and contains several new songs, as well as several old ones, re-recorded with new sound and production.

Members

Timeline

Discography

Studio albums
Divlje Jagode (1979) (Wild Strawberries)
Stakleni Hotel (1981) (Glass Hotel)
Motori (1982) (Motorcycles)
Čarobnjaci (1983) (Wizards)
Vatra (album) (1985) (Fire)
Wild Strawberries (1987) - as Wild Strawberries
Konji (1988) (Horses)
Magic Love (1993) - released as solo album by Zele Lipovača
Labude, kad rata ne bude (1994) (Swan, when the war is gone)
Sto vjekova (1997) (100 Centuries)
Od neba do neba (2003) (From sky to sky)
Biodinamička ljubav (2013) (Biodynamic love)
Jukebox (2020)

Compilations
Najbolje (1986)
Sarajevo, ti i ja (1993)
Antologija 1 (1995)
Antologija 2 (1995)
The Very Best Of: Let na drugi svijet (2004)
The Ultimate Collection (2008)
The Love Collection: Najljepše ljubavne pjesme (2011)
Greatest Hits (2015)
Original Album Collection Vol.1 and Vol.2 (2018)

Singles 
"Jedina moja" / "Rock 'n' Roll" (1977)
"Moj dilbere" / "Prijatelj" (1977)
"Patkica" / "Kad bi vi, gospođo" (1978)
"Nemam ništa protiv" / "Bit će bolje" (1979)
"Piramida" (2006)
"Zvijezda sjevera" (2007)
"Ne, nisam ja" (2012)
"Evo banke cigane moj" (2016)
"Znamo da je kraj (2018)
"Zauvijek tvoj" (2018)
"Zbog tebe draga" (2019)
"Sama si" (1983)

References

External links

Official Site

Bosnia and Herzegovina heavy metal musical groups
Musical groups established in 1977
Musical quartets
Musical trios
Yugoslav hard rock musical groups
Yugoslav heavy metal musical groups
Yugoslav glam metal musical groups